Kali River is a river in western India in Gujarat whose origin is Near Ravleshvar village . Its basin has a maximum length of 40 km.

References

Rivers of Gujarat
Rivers of India